J. S. Onkar Singh is a former Indian politician.

External links
 http://www.elections.in/uttar-pradesh/parliamentary-constituencies/badaun.html

Year of birth missing (living people)
Living people
India MPs 1962–1967
India MPs 1967–1970
Lok Sabha members from Uttar Pradesh
Uttar Pradesh MLAs 1952–1957
Members of the Uttar Pradesh Legislative Council
People from Budaun district
Uttar Pradesh district councillors
India MPs 1977–1979
Bharatiya Jana Sangh politicians